Bauyrjan Momyshuly is a Line 1 station of Almaty Metro that opened to the public on 30 May, 2022. It was originally planned to be opened in 2018; however, the completion date was moved to 2022. The station is located near the intersection of Abay Avenue and Momyshuly Street.

Almaty Metro stations
Railway stations opened in 2022
2022 establishments in Kazakhstan